"The Silent Sun" (album title "Silent Sun") is the debut single by English rock band Genesis.  It was written by Tony Banks and Peter Gabriel when the band's producer, Jonathan King, first discovered them, before he decided to produce an entire album, a heavy investment.  Knowing that King was a fan of the Bee Gees, Banks and Gabriel wrote the song specifically to capture his attention.  The song was released as a single on 2 February 1968. They would soon begin work on their debut album, From Genesis to Revelation.

"The Silent Sun" is a fusion of folk rock and pop rock. The heavy use of orchestral strings and lightweight romantic lyrics make this song different from the progressive music on Genesis' second album, Trespass. The song, like most of From Genesis to Revelation, has not appeared on any Genesis compilation or live album.

It was reissued in very limited quantities in July 2006 as a CD-single under the title "The Silent Sun 2006", with "When the Sour Turns to Sweet 2006" as its B-side. The versions on this CD-single are remix/remaster versions, also available on the 2006 reissue of the band's 1969 debut album. Since this is the last official single release by Genesis, this makes The Silent Sun both the debut and the final single released by Genesis.

Personnel
Tony Banks – piano, backing vocals
Peter Gabriel – lead vocals
Anthony Phillips – acoustic guitar, backing vocals
Mike Rutherford – bass, backing vocals
Chris Stewart – drums

Additional personnel
Arthur Greenslade – orchestral arrangements

References

1968 songs
1968 debut singles
Decca Records singles
2006 singles
Genesis (band) songs
Folk rock songs
Songs written by Peter Gabriel
Songs written by Tony Banks (musician)
Songs written by Mike Rutherford
Songs written by Anthony Phillips
Baroque pop songs
Psychedelic pop songs